Phanuel Bacon (13 October 1700 – 10 January 1783) was an English playwright, poet and author. He was the son of the Phanuel Bacon, vicar of St Laurence's church, in Reading.

Life
In his youth, Bacon attended John Roysse's Free School in Abingdon (now Abingdon School), from 1712-1715  and later entered St John's College, Oxford. He became vicar of Bramber, Sussex, and rector of Marsh Baldon, Oxfordshire.

Works
Among his works are 
The Kite (1722), An Heroi-comical Poem. In Three Canto's 
The Moral Quack (1757), A Dramatic Satire
The Insignificants(1757), A Comedy of Five Acts.
The Tryal of the Timekillers (1757), A comedy of five acts
The Occulist (1757), A Dramatic Entertainment of Two Acts
The Taxes (1757), A Dramatick Entertainment
The Snipe (1765), poem

See also
 List of Old Abingdonians

References

1700 births
1783 deaths
18th-century English Anglican priests
English dramatists and playwrights
18th-century English poets
Fellows of St John's College, Oxford
People educated at Abingdon School
writers from Reading, Berkshire
People educated at Reading School
English male dramatists and playwrights
English male poets
18th-century English male writers
18th-century English writers
People from Bramber